Merlin Ammon Ditmer (April 9, 1886 – March 10, 1950) was an American football and basketball coach. He served as the head football coach (1920–1926) and head men's basketball coach (1920–1925) at Otterbein University in Westerville, Ohio. Ditmer moved to Oxford, Ohio to work an assistant football and basketball coach at Miami University before serving as the school's athletic director from 1941 to 1948.

Head coaching record

Football

References

External links
 

1886 births
1950 deaths
Basketball coaches from Ohio
Miami RedHawks athletic directors
Miami RedHawks football coaches
Miami RedHawks men's basketball coaches
Otterbein Cardinals football coaches
Otterbein Cardinals men's basketball coaches
Otterbein University alumni
People from Miami County, Ohio
Players of American football from Ohio